Aladdin tower  or Aladole tower or Gunbad-i Ala al-Din  ( - Dome of Aladdin)  is a monumental tower over tomb of its patron built in Ilkhanid era in centre of  Varamin, Iran.

Architecture 
The tomb is a cylindrical tower in the inside and a thirty-two right-angled triangular flanges or columns on the outside. Made of high-quality baked bricks assembled in a hazarbaf (decorative brickwork, literally meaning "thousand weaving") decorative pattern, the flanges ascend from the plinth until they meet the cornice that supports the conical roof with corbelled groin arches. Between the upper end of the flanges and the small groin arches above them runs an inscription band paralleling the zigzag shape of the flanges. The cornice displays fine tile work alternating between unglazed and glazed terracotta in light blue. As with most tomb towers, the tomb tower of 'Ala ad-Din has a double-shell dome, conical on the exterior and spherical on the inside, above the circular interior plan.

References 

Towers in Iran
Mausoleums in Iran
Buildings and structures in Tehran Province
Buildings and structures completed in 1289
Varamin